Saleh Al-Saydan (born 11 September 1978) is a Saudi Arabian sprinter. He competed in the men's 4 × 400 metres relay at the 1996 Summer Olympics.

References

1978 births
Living people
Athletes (track and field) at the 1996 Summer Olympics
Saudi Arabian male sprinters
Olympic athletes of Saudi Arabia
Place of birth missing (living people)